The Waagepetersen House is a listed Neoclassical town mansion located at Store Strandstræde 18 in Copenhagen, Denmark.  The house takes its name after royal wine merchant Christian Waagepetersen who owned it from 1811 to 1840. His home was a meetingplace for many of the leading figures of the Danish Golden Age.

History

Early history

The property (then No. 50) was in 1689 owned by the widow of distiller Jens Madsen. In 1756, it was as No. 112 the site of the rectory of the Lord God of Sabaoth Church (Den Herre Zebaoths Kirke).

The current building was constructed in 1792-1793 by Johan Martin Quist. The property was in the new cadastre of 1806 listed as St. Ann's East Quarter, No. 79 and was at this point still owned by Quist. The writer and economist Christen Pram was among the residents in 1796. Cai Friedrich, Count Reventlow resided in the building in 1798-1801.

The Waagepetersen era

The property was in 1814 acquired by the wine merchant Christian Petersen (later Christian Waagepetersen). He lived there with his large family but also ran his business from the premises. His early tenants during his ownership included the physician Frederik Ludvig Bang who lived in the building from 1812 to 1814 and the composer, conductor and violinist Claus Schall, who lived in the building from 1822 to 1824

Waagepetersen had a passion for the arts and his home in Store Strandstræde was in the 1820s and 1830s a meetingplace for many of the leading figures of the Danish Golden Age. He was especially fond of music as witnessed by the fact that he named three of his sons after Haydn, Mozart and Beethoven.

The musicians Weyse, Kuhlau and Hartmann were frequent guests and often performed at music soirées. Other guests included the painters Eckersberg and Wilhelm Marstrand.

Christian Waagepetersen died in 1840. The house in Store Strandstræde was then taken over by Mozart Waagepetersen and his wife Charlotte Caroline Mathilde Waagepetersen. Christoffer Schram	(1776-) resided as a widower with an unmarried daughter in the apartment on the ground flor. His sister-in-law Henriette Jørgensen, an actress at the Royal Danish Theatre, was also part of the household. Carl Malling (1791-),a senior customs officer, resided with his wife and three unmarried children in the apartment on the second floor.

Mozart Waagepetersen and his wife's only child was Gaston Waagepetersen, an adopted son born outside marriage by Alce Tutein. Mozart Waagepetersen purchased the country house Rosendal in Østerbro. Both properties were sold in 1878. The family then lived at Rosenvængets Side Allé 6 in  Østerbro.

Later history
The company De Forende Papirfabrikker A/S  (The United Paper Mills) were based in the building from its foundation in 1889.

The Danish state acquired the building in the early 1980s. In 1984-1986, it was adapted for use as a new home for Nordic Council by the architects Ib and Jørgen Rasmussen.  Nordic Council moved out in 2010 after taking over Hotel Royal's former building at Ved Stranden.

Architecture
The building consists of three storeys and a cellar and is built to a somewhat unorthodox design. The three-bay median risilit is decorated with four Ionic order pilasters on the two lower floors Above the pilasters, between the second and third floor, runs a Greek key frieze. The median risilit is not tipped by the usual triangular pediment but instead by a three bay wall dormer with a hip roof.

Today
The building was converted into 32 apartments in 2012, varying in size from 74 to 287 square metres. The two largest apartments has later been merged into one 474 square metre apartment by Joe & the Juice-founder Kasper Basse with the assistance of the architects Tom Lundberg og Stig Marvits. It was put on the market at a price of DKK 50 million in 2016.

The building also contains three commercial tenancies. The wine bar Nabiolo has been located in the basement since May 2015.

References

External links

 Drawing in the Danish National Art Library
 Source

Listed residential buildings in Copenhagen
Neoclassical architecture in Copenhagen
Residential buildings completed in 1893